On 3 August 1979, a Constitutional Convention election was held in East Azerbaijan Province (also encompassing the present-day Ardabil Province) with plurality-at-large voting format in order to decide all six seats for the Assembly for the Final Review of the Constitution.

The result was a relative victory for the Muslim People's Republic Party (MPRP) over the Islamic Republican Party (IRP). A stronghold of Mohammad Kazem Shariatmadari supporters, it was one of the few constituencies where Khomeinist candidates did not end up winning a landslide. Out of the six seats up for the election, four went to those endorsed by the MPRP while the IRP had listed three winners (one candidates was supported by both). Lay candidates supported by groups such as the Freedom Movement of Iran and the Movement of Militant Muslims were defeated. Khomeini published a fatwa banning the People's Mujahedin of Iran from government elections. Secular nationalists and communists could not receive more than 3% of the votes.

Results

 
 
 
 
 
 
|-
|colspan="14" style="background:#E9E9E9;"|
|-
 
 
 
 
 
 
 
 
 
 
 
 
 
 
 
 
 

 

 
 

|-
|colspan=14|
|-
|colspan=14|Source:

References

1979 elections in Iran
East Azerbaijan Province